Ralph Sall is an American record producer, music supervisor, composer, songwriter and screenwriter. He is the president of Bulletproof Entertainment, a company involved in several facets of the entertainment industry, including film, television, comic books and graphic novels, music, internet and live theatre.

Personal life
Sall is a Summa Cum Laude Phi Beta Kappa graduate of Yale University. A native of Miami, he currently resides in Los Angeles with his wife Lisa and their three young children.

Career
As a record producer, Sall has produced tracks with Paul McCartney, The Ramones, Stone Temple Pilots, Jewel, Sugar Ray, Sublime, Smash Mouth, Cheap Trick, Aerosmith, Jane’s Addiction and Creed. As a songwriter, Sall has written tracks for Liz Phair, Jewel, George Clinton and Sugar Ray.

Tracks by his group, All Too Much, have been featured in the romantic comedies The In-Laws (2003), Failure to Launch (2006) and License to Wed (2007).

Sall has written and produced original songs for films, including "Rollin’ with My Homies", co-written with Coolio, for Clueless (1995) and "Words to Me", with Sugar Ray, for Scooby-Doo (2002).

As composer and executive music producer on Andrew Fleming’s Hamlet 2 (2008), Sall wrote the majority of the music and performed the songs "Rock Me Sexy Jesus" and "You’re as Gay as the Day Is Long" under The Ralph Sall Experience. He previously collaborated with Fleming on the films Threesome (1994), The Craft (1996), Dick (1999) and Nancy Drew (2007). He scored The New Guy (2002) and Grind (2003), the latter of which he also wrote the screenplay.

Sall won the 1994 Razzie Award (Worst Original Song) for the song "Addams Family (Whoomp!)" from Addams Family Values. He shared the award with co-writers Stephen Gibson and Cecil Glenn.

Other ventures
Sall’s Interstellar Force, a dance music project, charted a Billboard hit with their cover of the Star Wars theme.

Sall produced the tribute album Deadicated, featuring the songs of the Grateful Dead. He went on to create the triple-platinum selling Common Thread: The Songs of the Eagles, Stoned Immaculate: The Music of the Doors and the Gold-certified Saturday Morning: Cartoons' Greatest Hits, as well as the Paul McCartney tribute The Art of McCartney, released in November 2014.

Filmography

Music supervisor

Discography

Compilations
Common Thread: The Songs of the Eagles (1994)
Saturday Morning: Cartoons' Greatest Hits (1995)
Stoned Immaculate: The Music of the Doors (2000)
Southern Rock Country Style (2004)
Hey, That's Funny!: Comedy's Greatest Hits (2004)
The Art of McCartney (2014)

References

External links

1963 births
Living people
21st-century American composers
American entertainment industry businesspeople
American film score composers
American male screenwriters
American male film score composers
Musicians from Miami
Record producers from Florida
Songwriters from Florida
Yale University alumni
Screenwriters from Florida
21st-century American male musicians
American male songwriters